Aaron Belisarius Cosmo Sibthorpe (183?–1916) was a nineteenth century African historian. He published both History and Geography of Sierra Leone in 1868.

Sibthorpe was born somewhere near Benin, and after being captured and enslaved, he became a Liberated African in colonial Sierra Leone while still a youth. He remained in Sierra Leone all his life. He became a school teacher, teaching in villages around Freetown.

He became a prominent member of the Creole community. However, by the time of his death he had been forgotten.

References

1830s births
1916 deaths
Sierra Leone Creole historians
Sierra Leone Creole people
Historians of Sierra Leone